Philips Vingboons (or Vinckboons, Vinckeboons, Vinckbooms) ( – 2 October 1678) was a Dutch architect.  He was part of the school of Jacob van Campen, that is, Dutch Classicism. Vingboons was especially highly regarded in his native city of Amsterdam.

Biography

Philips Vingboons was born in circa 1607 in Amsterdam in the Dutch Republic. His father David Vinckboons was a painter from the Southern Netherlands who had fled from Antwerp to Amsterdam during the Dutch Revolt. Vingboons had nine brothers and sisters. His brother Johannes Vingboons was a painter and his brother Justus Vingboons also was an architect.

Vingboons started his career as a painter in the family business with his father and siblings, where he was educated with cartography, mathematics, architecture, and classics. He later became an architect, and he was possibly a student of the architect Jacob van Campen. He became engaged to Petronella Questiés on 21 April 1645, when he was 37 years old. He had a set of his designs engraved by his brother Jan in 1648 for the Amsterdam council, and Justus Danckerts published these in 1688. Thanks to this book, much of his work can be attributed accurately, including some designs that were not executed, such as his maquette for the Amsterdam city hall, and the buitenplaats Vredenburch in Beemster. Vingboons died in 1678 and was buried on 10 February 1678 in Amsterdam.

Architecture

In contrast with Jacob van Campen, Vingboons knew how to fit classicism creatively with the typically narrow city houses of Amsterdam.  Philips Vingboons is well named as the inventor of the Amsterdam "Halsgevel" (literally neck front) type of facade, since in 1638 he designed the oldest surviving "Halsgevel" in Amsterdam, at Herengracht 168.  Indeed, it is even sometimes called the "Vingboonsgevel" after him.  It was widely imitated in the period of Dutch Classicism (1640–1665) on a grand scale.  On simpler houses, it appeared as a simple brick pilaster-halsgevel, with a few restrained ornaments - this type is named a "Vingboons-imitatie" (Vingboons-imitation).

Another of his designs was Kloveniersburgwal 95, in 1642, one of the most finely proportioned classical-school city-palaces in Amsterdam.  Philips Vingboons lived during the high point of Amsterdam's power and wealth, halfway through the 17th century, and became the city's most important architect and designer.  He especially designed houses since, as a Catholic, he was passed over for state commissions.  In 1648 and 1674 a book was published with Philips Vingboons' designs ("Afbeeldsels"), through which we have a good idea of his work.

Works in Amsterdam

|}

Other works
Vingboons designed country homes for Amsterdam regency members such as Driemond, near Weesp, 1642, Havezate Rollecate near Vollenhove, circa 1654, Westwijk for Reinier Pauw de Jonge (1637) in Purmer, Nijenhuis and Peckendam near Diepenheim, 1656, Gansenhoef in Maarssen, Vanenburg for Hendrik van Eessen near Harderwijk, 1664, Borg Nittersum for Joan Clant in Stedum, and Harsveld in Ootmarsum.

Sources
Bureau Monumentenzorg Amsterdam
Koen Ottenheym, Philips Vingboons (1607-1678), architect, Zutphen, 1989, 
Jacobine E. Huisken, Friso Lammertse, Het kunstbedrijf van de familie Vingboons. Schilders, architecten en kaartmakers in de gouden eeuw, Maarssen, 1989, 
Jacqueline Heijenbrok, Guido Steenmeijer, Een stadswandeling langs de huizen van Philips en Justus Vingboons, Den Haag/Amsterdam, 1989,

External links

Dutch Golden Age architects
1600s births
1678 deaths
Dutch Roman Catholics
Artists from Amsterdam
17th-century Dutch artists